Great Oakley may refer to:
Great Oakley, Essex, England
Great Oakley, Northamptonshire, England